Albany Senior High School may refer to one of two educational establishments:

 Albany Senior High School, Auckland
 Albany Senior High School, Western Australia

See also
Albany High School (disambiguation)
Albany Junior/Senior High School, Albany, Texas